For Whom the Bell Tolls is a 1943 American epic war film produced and directed by Sam Wood and starring Gary Cooper, Ingrid Bergman, Akim Tamiroff, Katina Paxinou and Joseph Calleia. The screenwriter Dudley Nichols based his script on the 1940 novel For Whom the Bell Tolls by American novelist Ernest Hemingway. The film is about an American International Brigades volunteer, Robert Jordan (Cooper), who is fighting in the Spanish Civil War against the fascists. During his desperate mission to blow up a strategically important bridge to protect Republican forces, Jordan falls in love with a young woman guerrilla fighter (Bergman).

For Whom the Bell Tolls was Ingrid Bergman's first Technicolor film. Hemingway's desire for Cooper and Bergman for the leading roles was much publicized, but Paramount initially cast Vera Zorina with Cooper. After shooting footage with Zorina's hair cut short (truer to the novel's character — a shorn head — than Bergman's "look" in the film), she was replaced with Bergman.

The day's papers described the recasting: "They [Paramount] compromised on Zorina's hair, cutting it to two inches; the rest of the makeup was true to the book. The results were shown to Paramount executives. They gasped. 'No glamour,' they explained. 'She looks like a dishrag.' Sam Wood, producer-director, sighed. 'The part doesn't call for glamour,' he tried to explain. 'Well, she ought to have glamour without looking like it.' They tried it. They put caps on Zorina's teeth, touched up her facial makeup with a bit of mascara here and there, tailored the baggy pants to a slim hip, and gave the shirt an uplift. She looked more like the lovely Zorina but not at all like the hapless 'Maria.' They gave up. Miss Bergman was tested for the part. The tests were made with her hair long and the executives beamed. She looked glamorous. Tomorrow they will cut her hair short. They will dress her in baggy pants and a formless shirt. After that, no one knows."

The film was nominated for nine Academy Awards, winning one. Victor Young's soundtrack for the film was the first complete score from an American film to be issued on record.

Plot
During the Spanish Civil War, an American language teacher, Robert Jordan, who lived in Spain during the pre-war period, fights in the International Brigades against Francisco Franco's forces. An experienced dynamiter, Jordan is ordered to travel behind enemy lines and destroy a critical bridge with the aid of a band of local anti-fascist guerrillas. The bridge must be blown up to prevent enemy troops from traveling across it to respond to an upcoming offensive against the fascists.

Jordan meets an old man, Anselmo, who is a guerrilla fighter who will serve as Jordan's liaison with the local guerrilla fighters. Anselmo leads Jordan to a group of Republican guerrillas who are led by a middle-aged man named Pablo. Jordan falls in love with one of the guerrillas, a young woman named María. María's life was shattered by her parents' execution and her gang-rape at the hands of the Falangists (part of the fascist coalition) at the outbreak of the war. Jordan has a strong sense of duty, which clashes with the unwillingness of the guerrilla leader Pablo to commit to helping with the bridge-blowing operation, as it would endanger himself and his band. At the same time, Jordan develops a new-found lust for life which arises from his love for María. Pablo's wife Pilar displaces Pablo as the group leader and pledges the allegiance of the guerrillas to Jordan's mission. However, when another band of anti-fascist guerrillas, led by El Sordo, is surrounded and killed in a desperate last stand, Pablo destroys Jordan's dynamite detonation equipment, hoping to prevent the bridge demolition and thereby avoid fascist reprisals on his camp. Later, Pablo regrets abandoning his comrades and returns to assist in the operation.

However, the enemy, apprised of the coming offensive, has prepared to ambush the Republicans in force and it seems unlikely that blowing up the bridge will do much to prevent a rout. Regardless, Jordan understands that he must still demolish the bridge in an attempt to prevent fascist reinforcements from overwhelming his allies. Lacking the equipment destroyed by Pablo, Jordan and Anselmo improvise an alternative method to explode the dynamite by using hand grenades. Jordan attaches wires to the grenades so that their pins can be pulled from a distance. This improvised plan is considerably more dangerous than using conventional detonators, because the men must increase their proximity to the explosion.

While the guerrilla fighters—Pablo, Pilar, and María—create a diversion for Jordan and Anselmo, the two men plant and detonate the dynamite, costing Anselmo his life when he is hit by a piece of debris from the exploding bridge. While the guerrillas are escaping on horseback, Jordan is maimed when a fascist tank shoots his horse out from under him. Jordan cannot feel his legs and he knows that if his comrades stop to rescue him, they too will be captured or killed. He bids goodbye to María and ensures that she escapes to safety with the surviving guerrillas. Armed with a Lewis machine gun, he waits until the horse-mounted fascist soldiers appear in his gun sights. He then pulls the trigger, firing a sweeping barrage at the oncoming soldiers. The film ends with Jordan firing the Lewis gun directly at the camera.

Cast

Restoration
The film was originally released in a roadshow format, at 170 minutes (not counting intermission). For re-release, it was trimmed to 134 minutes, and it was not seen at its full length until the late 1990s, when it was archivally restored to 168 minutes. This restored version is the one that has been released on DVD. The restoration was photochemical, not digital, and the titles and some of the scenes in the early reels are slightly to significantly out-of-register.

Reception
For Whom the Bell Tolls was the second-highest-grossing film of 1943, earning $6.3 million in distributor rentals in the United States and Canada. A re-issue in 1957 earned an additional $800,000. When adjusted for inflation and the size of the population when released, it ranks among the top 100 popular movies of all time at the domestic box office.

Accolades

16th Academy Awards
Wins

 Best Actress in a Supporting Role: Katina Paxinou

Nominations
 Outstanding Motion Picture: Paramount
 Best Actor: Gary Cooper
 Best Actress: Ingrid Bergman
 Best Actor in a Supporting Role: Akim Tamiroff
 Best Cinematography (Color): Ray Rennahan
 Best Art Direction (Color): Art Direction: Hans Dreier, Haldane Douglas; Interior Decoration: Bertram Granger
 Best Film Editing: Sherman Todd, John F. Link Sr.
 Best Music (Music Score of a Dramatic or Comedy Picture): Victor Young

1st Golden Globe Awards
Wins

 Best Performance by an Actress in a Supporting Role - Motion Picture: Katina Paxinou
 Best Performance by an Actor in a Supporting Role - Motion Picture: Akim Tamiroff

Others
The film is recognized by the American Film Institute in these lists:
 2002: AFI's 100 Years...100 Passions – Nominated
 2005: AFI's 100 Years...100 Movie Quotes:
 Maria: "I do not know how to kiss, or I would kiss you. Where do the noses go?" – Nominated
 2005: AFI's 100 Years of Film Scores – Nominated

Other versions
There was a one-hour Lux Radio Theatre version broadcast on February 12, 1945, which retained the principal cast from the film: Gary Cooper, Ingrid Bergman, and Akim Tamiroff.

See also
 List of Spanish Civil War films

References

Further reading
 Tibbetts, John C., and James M. Welsh, eds. The Encyclopedia of Novels Into Film (2nd ed. 2005) pp 133–135.

External links

Streaming audio
 Radio adaptation of For Whom The Bell Tolls February 12, 1945 on Lux Radio Theatre; 50 minutes, with the original stars (MP3)

1943 films
1943 romantic drama films
1940s war drama films
American romantic drama films
American war drama films
Spanish Civil War films
War romance films
Films based on works by Ernest Hemingway
Films featuring a Best Supporting Actor Golden Globe winning performance
Films featuring a Best Supporting Actress Academy Award-winning performance
Films featuring a Best Supporting Actress Golden Globe-winning performance
Paramount Pictures films
Films directed by Sam Wood
Films with screenplays by Dudley Nichols
Films scored by Victor Young
1940s English-language films
1940s American films